Gen. Gharzai Khwakhuzhi, son of Mohammad Ibraheem Khwakhuzhi (poet, writer, journalist, politician and a leadership member of the Weesh Zalmyan movement as well as Progressive Democratic Party of Afghanistan under the leadership of Mohammad Hashim Maiwandwal) original resident of Kandahar was born in Kabul on 29 May 1961.

Accolade

Gharzai Khwakhuzhi has been honored with following awards from the Government of Afghanistan through his life:
 First Grade Star Badge
 Second Grade Star Badge
 Courage, Service, Youths of Afghanistan and Sayed Jamal-ud-deen Afghan Medals
 Second Grade Award from Information and Culture Ministry in section of History and Literature for his book (the Great Game)

Literary works

 Dawn of Democracy in Afghanistan (Pashto) 
 Kandahar and Historic Occasions (Pashto)
 Great Game (Pashto)
 A view to circulation of Elections and Democracy in Afghanistan (Pashto)
 Memories of Khwakhuzhi (Pashto)
 Afghanistan toward Democracy (Dari)
 Personality for Ever, Late. Prof. Reshad (Pashto)
 Don't try the tried! (Pashto)
 Dawn of Democracy in Afghanistan (Translated to English from Pashto)
 Jirgas (Assemblies) Throughout History of Afghanistan (Pashto)
 Articles Critics and analysis in newspapers and magazines (Pashto, Dari and translation of them in English)

External links
 Khwakhuzhi's Homepage
 Khwakhuzhi's Facebook Page

Afghan writers
1962 births
Living people
People from Kandahar
Baloch people
Government ministers of Afghanistan